is a private university in Isesaki, Gunma, Japan, established in 1968. The predecessor of the school was founded in 1950. The university has a secondary campus in the city of Takasaki, Gunma.

History
 1968: Jobu University was established (with Department of Commercial Science). Shinmachi High School and Shinmachi Kindergarten were annexed to Jobu University and were renamed to Jobu University High School and Jobu University Kindergarten, respectively.
 1986: School of Business, Department of Business Management and Information was established.
 1997: Graduate School of Management and Administration was established.
 2002: Department of Commercial Science was renamed to School of Business Information, International Business Department.
 2004: Shinmachi Campus (current Takasaki Campus) opened. The School of Nursing was established.
 2008: Takasaki Media Center opened.
 2012: School of Business Information, International Business Department and School of Business, Department of Business Management and Information were merged and renamed to School of Business Information, Department of Sports and Health Management.

Organization

Undergraduate
 School of Business Information
 Department of Sports and Health Management (244 students as of 2014)
 Department of International Business (123 students as of 2014)
 School of Nursing
 Department of Nursing (390 students as of 2014)

Graduate
 School of Management and Administration (41 students as of 2014)
 Management and Administration Track
 Accounting System Track
 Management and Information System Track
 Marketing Distribution and Economics Track
 Sports and Health Management Track

Student life

Sports
 Baseball
 Long-distance relay road race
 Jobu University has participated in Hakone Ekiden since 2009 for seven consecutive years.

Handwriting Culture Lab
Headed by Mr. Kunio Koike, a leading artist and educator in Etegami (Drawing Letter), the Handwriting Culture Lab was established in 2014 to study hand-writing and hand-drawing as part of indispensable part of humanities. The Lab consists of five faculty members and Ms. Tomoko Shibuya, Chairperson of the Board of Trustees of Jobu University, as an advisor.

Facilities

Campus
 Isesaki Campus (634-1 Toyazukamachi, Isesaki, Gunma 3728588)
 School of Business Information
 Baseball and football fields
 Takasaki Campus (270-1 Shinmachi, Takasaki, Gunma 3701393)
 School of Nursing and Graduate School of Management and Administration

External links

 Official website 

Private universities and colleges in Japan
Universities and colleges in Gunma Prefecture
Educational institutions established in 1968
1968 establishments in Japan
Isesaki, Gunma